The gypsy moth, an invasive species from Eurasia, was discovered in New Zealand. The gypsy moth has potentially disastrous effects on New Zealand agriculture; an intensive eradication programme was planned and undertaken, and the moth did not become established.

Gypsy moth eggs are frequently found during border biosecurity checks, commonly on used vehicles, and were first discovered in the 1990s.

2003 Hamilton Gypsy Moth spray 
In 2003 a live adult moth in viable condition was found in an early warning pheromone trap in the North Island city of Hamilton. Since Hamilton is an entry point for a large amount of international air freight it was presumed that the moth had entered New Zealand in an aircraft. An aerial pesticide spraying programme by the Ministry of Agriculture and Forestry using the Foray 48B insecticide was carried out over the city from October 2003. Health concerns were raised, but a report to the Ministry of Health concluded that there were no grounds for the concerns. In 2004, The Ministry of Agriculture and Forestry declined Hamilton's Fraser High School's compensation claim for the cost of relief teachers to cover staff absences during the operation.

See also
Invasive species in New Zealand
Gypsy moths in the United States

References

Further reading

Invasive animal species in New Zealand
Lymantria dispar
2003 in New Zealand
Hamilton, New Zealand
2003 disasters in New Zealand